McClellan Creek National Grassland is a National Grassland located in southern Gray County, Texas, United States. It was purchased with the goal of restoring badly eroded land to its natural state. The grassland is administered by the U.S. Forest Service together with Cibola National Forest and Black Kettle, Kiowa, and Rita Blanca National Grasslands, from common headquarters located in Albuquerque, New Mexico. The grassland is part of the combined Black Kettle and McClellan Creek Ranger District with offices in Cheyenne, Oklahoma.

In February 2006, all of McClellan Creek National Grassland was burnt out in the  Interstate 40 fire. The majority of the trees were lost. The grassland's area is only . The grasslands surrounds McClellan Lake, a reservoir on the namesake McClellan Creek.

Gallery

See also
 List of protected grasslands of North America

References

External links

 Black Kettle and McClellan Creek National Grasslands

National Grasslands of the United States
Grasslands of the North American Great Plains
Grasslands of Texas
Cibola National Forest
Protected areas of Gray County, Texas